Pimlico, a neighborhood in Baltimore, Maryland, is the site of Pimlico Race Course, which holds the Preakness Stakes, one of the three legs of the Triple Crown of Thoroughbred Racing. From 1896 through 1915, Pimlico was also the home of Baltimore's Electric Park, a popular amusement park located near the intersection of Reisterstown Road and Belvedere Avenue.

Demographics
As of the U.S. Census of 2000, there were 1,145 people living in the Pimlico neighborhood. The racial makeup of Pimlico was 5.1 percent White, 90.6 percent African American, 0.3 percent Native American, 0.3 percent Asian. 59.8 percent of occupied housing units were owner-occupied. 9.3 percent of housing units were vacant. Pimlico has a significant and growing number of Jamaican and African immigrants.

35.5 percent of those in the civilian labor force were employed. The median household income was $23,654.

Artist Marie E. Johnson-Calloway was born in Pimlico.

See also
 List of Baltimore neighborhoods

Notes

External links 
 Northwest District Maps

African culture in Maryland
Jamaican-American history
Neighborhoods in Baltimore
Northwest Baltimore